Dennis Michael Munari (18 April 1948 – 2 February 2023) was an Australian rules footballer who played with Carlton and North Melbourne in the VFL.

Munari joined Carlton in 1967 from Assumption College  and was the second rover to Adrian Gallagher in Carlton's premiership side the following season. From 1971 to 1973 he spent time as playing coach at Hobart and had a stint at VFA club Preston before returning to the VFL in 1974, at North Melbourne. Despite being with North for four seasons he managed just 13 games.

Munari died on 2 February 2023, at the age of 74.

References

External links

Blueseum profile

1948 births
2023 deaths
Australian rules footballers from Victoria (Australia)
Carlton Football Club players
Carlton Football Club Premiership players
North Melbourne Football Club players
Hobart Football Club players
Hobart Football Club coaches
Preston Football Club (VFA) players
One-time VFL/AFL Premiership players